The Pipe Creek Sinkhole near Swayzee in Grant County, Indiana, is one of the most important paleontological sites in the interior of the eastern half of North America. It is preserved because it was buried by glacial till. Uncovered in 1996 by workers at the Pipe Creek Junior limestone quarry, the sinkhole has yielded a diverse array of fossils from the Pliocene epoch, dating back five million years. Discoveries have been made there of the remains of camelids, bears, beavers, frogs, snakes, turtles, and several previously unknown species of rodents.  Two fish taxa, bullhead (Ameiurus) and sunfish (Centrarchidae), have also been found there.

Origin and importance
The Pipe Creek Sinkhole preserves an ancient wetland. It was created by the collapse of a limestone cave in a Silurian reef formation. When water collected in the depression, it became the habitat of the plants and animals whose remains were preserved there when the sinkhole was buried by glacial outwash and till during the Pleistocene Epoch, two million to 11,000 years ago.

While the ecology of the Pliocene in North America is well-known from fossil discoveries in other places, notably coastal sites, the Pleistocene glaciers destroyed or scattered most of the fossil remains in the continent's interior. The Pipe Creek Sinkhole, however, was buried by the glaciers and the debris they left, making it the only known Pliocene example in the central part of the eastern half of the continent.

The sinkhole's ecology
The ancient wetland was home to a large and dense plant and animal population that includes both extinct and extant forms.  The climate was warm and temperate, but somewhat dry, possibly supporting a grassland-forest transitional zone. The preserved vertebrate fauna are dominated by aquatic species, particularly leopard frogs, which are still common throughout the United States. Mammalian finds include an early rhinoceros (Teleoceras, possibly from the Miocene epoch), canids, peccaries and short-faced bear.

Backed by a grant from the National Science Foundation, researchers from the Indiana State Museum and several universities substantially completed field work at the sinkhole in the summer of 2004, but there was about one weeklong dig a year from 2005 to 2011. What probably was the last work at the site took place in 2014, with scientists and volunteers screening soil previously removed from the sinkhole.

See also
 Ashfall Fossil Beds
 Gray Fossil Site
 List of fossil sites (with link directory)
 List of sinkholes of the United States

References

 Farlow, James O. and Anne Argast, Preservation of Fossil Bone from the Pipe Creek Sinkhole (Late Neogene, Grant County, Indiana U.S.A.), Journal of the Paleontological Society of Korea, 22(1):51-75, 2006.
 Farlow, James O. et al.,  New Vertebrate Fossils from the Pipe Creek Sinkhole (Late Hemphillian, Grant County, Indiana) Paper No. 7-1, delivered at Geological Society of America, North-Central Section - 38th Annual Meeting (April 1–2, 2004), St. Louis, Missouri.
 Farlow, James O. et al., The Pipe Creek Sinkhole Biota, a Diverse Late Tertiary Continental Fossil Assemblage from Grant County, Indiana. American Midland Naturalist, 145:367-378.
 Kash, Steve, Amazing Fossils: Grant County Discovery Reveals Life from 3-6 million years ago, Outdoor Indiana, March/April 1999.
 Kash, Steve,  Dr. Jack Sunderman Looks at Ancient River, Outdoor Indiana, November/December 2001.
 Martin, Robert A., H. Thomas Goodwin and James O. Farlow,  Late Neogene (Late Hemphillian) Rodents from the Pipe Creek Sinkhole, Grant County, Indiana. Journal of Vertebrate Paleontology 22(1):137-151, March 2002.
 Sheets, Hope A., and James O. Farlow, Size-Frequency Distribution of Leopard Frogs (rana pipiens complex) from the Late Tertiary Pipe Creek Sinkhole, Grant County, Indiana, Paper no. 16-11 presented at the 37th Annual Meeting of the North-Central Section, Geological Society of America, 24–25 March 2003, Kansas City, Missouri.
 Simo, J.A., and Patrick J. Lehmann, Diagenetic History of Pipe Creek Jr. Reef, Silurian, North Central Indiana, U.S.A., Journal of Sedimentary Research, 70(4):937, July 2000.
 Sunderman, Jack A., Surprises in a Sinkhole, ACRES Quarterly, 42(3), Autumn 2003, published by ACRES Land Trust, Fort Wayne, Indiana.

External links
 The Pipe Creek Sinkhole
 Hillsdale College: Pipe Creek Sinkhole Project
 Hillsdale College: Animals of the Pipe Creek Sinkhole
 The Paleobiology Database: Taxonomic list for Pipe Creek Jr. Reef, Pipe Creek Jr. quarry, Grant County, Indiana: Silurian, Indiana
 Large-scale topographic map from TopoQuest
Bing Maps: The Pipe Creek Sinkhole
Farlow, James O. et al. (eds.), Geology of the Late Neogene Pipe Creek Sinkhole (Grant County, Indiana), Indiana Geological Survey Special Report 69, January 2010. Retrieved 21 October 2014.

June 21, 2011, Scientist sift through Pipe Creek Jr. sink hole one more time.

Sinkholes of the United States
Landforms of Grant County, Indiana
Quaternary Indiana
Pliocene United States
Pliocene paleontological sites of North America
Geologic formations of Indiana
Paleontology in Indiana
1996 in paleontology